The doctrine of the clarity of Scripture (often called the perspicuity of Scripture) is a Protestant Christian position teaching that "...those things which are necessary to be known, believed, and observed, for salvation, are so clearly propounded and opened in some place of Scripture or other, that not only the learned, but the unlearned, in a due use of the ordinary means, may attain unto a sufficient understanding of them". Clarity of scripture is an important doctrinal and Biblical interpretive principle for historical Protestants and, today, for many evangelical Christians. Perspicuity of scripture does not imply that people will receive it for what it is, as many adherents to the doctrine of perspicuity of scripture accept the Calvinist teaching that man is depraved and needs the illumination of the Holy Spirit in order to see the meaning for what it is. Martin Luther advocated the clearness of scripture in his work On the Bondage of the Will. Arminius argued for the perspicuity of scripture by name in "The Perspicuity of the Scriptures".

In Lutheranism
Lutherans hold that the Bible presents all doctrines and commands of the Christian faith clearly. God's Word is freely accessible to every reader or hearer of ordinary intelligence, without requiring any special education. Of course, one must understand the language God's Word is presented in, and not be so preoccupied by contrary thoughts so as to prevent understanding. As a result of this, no one needs to wait for any clergy, and pope, scholar, or ecumenical council to explain the real meaning of any part of the Bible. Martin Luther attributed the difficulty in understanding Scripture to man's blindness and fallen state, "But, if many things still remain abstruse to many, this does not arise from obscurity in the Scriptures, but from [our] own blindness or want [i.e. lack] of understanding, who do not go the way to see the all-perfect clearness of the truth... Let, therefore, wretched men cease to impute, with blasphemous perverseness, the darkness and obscurity of their own heart to the all-clear scriptures of God."

See also
 Authorial intent
 Gymnobiblism
 Hermeneutics
 Rectilinear prophecy
 Prima scriptura
 Sola scriptura

References

External links
 Clarity of Scripture on Theopedia
 
 "On the Perspicuity of Scriptures", Works of James Arminius, Vol.2

Christian theology of the Bible
Protestant theology